Midland is a suburb in the Perth metropolitan region, as well as the regional centre for the City of Swan local government area that covers the Swan Valley and parts of the Darling Scarp to the east. It is situated at the intersection of Great Eastern Highway and Great Northern Highway.

History

Railway
Midland was the site of the Midland Railway Workshops - the main workshops for the Western Australian Government Railways (WAGR) for over 80 years. It was also a terminus for the Midland Railway Company. At the end of the Second World War it was the junction of the Midland Railway, the Upper Darling Range Railway, and the main Eastern Railway.

The Transperth suburban railway system currently has a terminus at Midland station.

Until 1966 the earlier railway station at Midland was the connecting location for trains to Bellevue and then onto Chidlow. Prior to 1954 it included the passenger service from the Mundaring Loop - or the original Eastern Railway (Western Australia), which went through Mundaring, Glen Forrest and Darlington. Until 1949 the passenger service to Kalamunda on the Upper Darling Range Railway was still operating via the 'Zig Zag' at Gooseberry Hill to Midland.

Commercial
Midland Junction developed around the Town Hall (1906) and Post Office (1913) sites and spread slowly east and north for over 70 years. The centrality of the main services, and the unusual presence of the Midland Railway Company sheds and yard directly adjacent to the Town Hall and Post Office, combined with the Government Railway Workshops, gave a focused sense of location to the commercial centre, and the local residences. The commercialisation of Great Eastern Highway roadfront residential properties to Bellevue was not complete before the 1990s.

In the 1970s the development of Midland Gate Shopping Centre completely changed the focus of the community, with businesses traditionally within walking distance of the Post Office and Railway Station closing down or shifting over the following decades. The re-development of the Midland Gate Shopping Centre has reasserted the car oriented nature of the regional centre, and the old centre of Midland is currently undergoing revitalisation and redevelopment with mixed use commercial and residential property providing the main focus.

Townsite 
Midland's townsite is based around both Great Eastern Highway, which carries east bound traffic, and Victoria Street, which carries westbound traffic. It is possible to transfer from one to the other via the Padbury Terrace intersection to access Great Eastern Highway from Victoria Street, or use Helena Street to complete the reverse.  Cale Street which forms the perimeter of the Midland Gate Shopping Centre also provides this access.

The townsite is lively and becoming increasingly busy attracting commuters from a wide surrounding area.  Commercial and retail trade has been expanded further east on Great Eastern Highway.  Continuing development in commercial and residential property within the original  townsite means that despite the age of the townsite, it has taken on a modern character which blends seamlessly with the original and it is the main port of call for eastern travellers who do not bypass the historical area via Roe Highway.

Redevelopment
It currently is being re-developed in part by the Midland Redevelopment Authority, which is organising redevelopment of the Railway Workshops site. Although some museum and storage facilities are being developed at the old workshops site, most of the massive railway superstructure and presence in Midland has gone.   The Redevelopment Authority has under its act been vested with lands that do not fully encompass the whole 'old town' of Midland, but only parts of it.

The Midland Saleyards which are at the eastern end of the Railway Workshop site have been in the process of closing and all the related businesses and properties are in the process of being relocated and redeveloped.  The Midland Military Markets at the northern edge of the Midland Saleyards - literally utilised an old Military site for a weekend market. The markets were destroyed by fire on 25 April 2007.  Not far west and adjacent to the Lloyd Street railway crossing - a large Harvey Norman store was opened in 2005 on the corner of Clayton and Lloyd Streets.

Parts of the Midland Railway Workshops site are home to a large Western Australian Police Operations Centre, Curtin University’s Midland Campus, as well as other projects. The Coal Storage dam at the western side of the Workshops has become an ornamental lake adjacent to residential redevelopment called 'Woodbridge Lakes'.

In November 2005 the State Government announced plans to construct a 326-bed hospital on the site of the old railway workshops. The new hospital, to replace the aging Swan District Hospital, was predicted to be open by 2011 at a cost of A$182.7 million. The hospital was opened on the 20th of November 2015 by Premier Colin Barnett, with operations beginning on the 24th of November.

Notable people from Midland

 James Knox: Catholic Archbishop of Melbourne- 1967 to 1974
 Ralph Sarich: engineer, inventor and entrepreneur
 Keith Slater: Australian cricketer and Australian rules footballer
 Ken Bagley: Australian rules footballer
 Jack Wong Sue: Chinese Australian soldier, mariner, author and entrepreneur
 Albert Facey: author of the auto-biography - A Fortunate Life
 Bruce Yardley: Australian cricketer
 Mike Richardson - Australian rules footballer
 Garry Sidebottom: Australian rules footballer
 Ian Williams - Australian rules footballer
 Allan Cuthbertson: actor
 Simon Katich: Australian cricketer
 Jessica Gomes: international model
 Cameron Meyer: Australian cyclist
 Travis Meyer: Australian cyclist
 Nic Naitanui: Australian rules footballer - West Coast Eagles
 Stephen Coniglio: Australian rules footballer - Greater Western Sydney Giants

See also
 Midland Junction Municipality
 Swan Express

References

 
Midland
Suburbs and localities in the City of Swan